The Apgar Fire Lookout in Glacier National Park is significant as one of a chain of fire lookout posts within the park. The low two-story frame-construction structure with a pyramidal roof was built in 1929. The design originated with the U.S. Forest Service and has been modified and re-used by the Forest Service and the National Park Service in a variety of contexts.

The first lookout at this location was destroyed by fire in 1929, two weeks after its completion. It was immediately replaced with the present structure.
The present structure is boarded up and not used.

References

Government buildings completed in 1929
Towers completed in 1929
Fire lookout towers on the National Register of Historic Places in Montana
Rustic architecture in Montana
National Register of Historic Places in Flathead County, Montana
1929 establishments in Montana
National Register of Historic Places in Glacier National Park